This list includes every town in Franconia where wine is grown with at least one Qualitätslage (appellation).

There are 24 so called Großlagen and 223 Lagen. In a Großlage 10 to 60 smaller Lagen are summarised.

Bereich Mainviereck

Großlage Reuschberg 
Hörstein (Alzenau): Abtsberg

Großlage Heiligenthal 
Großostheim: Reischklingenberg, Harstell

Großlagenfrei 
Aschaffenburg: Pompejaner, Godelsberg, Badberg
Bürgstadt: Mainhölle, Centgrafenberg
Dorfprozelten: Predigtstuhl
Eichenbühl: Hoher Berg
Engelberg (Großheubach): Klostergarten
Erlenbach am Main: Hochberg
Großheubach: Bischofsberg
Großwallstadt: Lützeltaler Berg
Klingenberg am Main: Einsiedel, Schlossberg
Kreuzwertheim: Kaffelstein
Michelbach (Alzenau): Goldberg, Steinberg, Aloisengarten, Apostelgarten
Miltenberg: Steingrübler
Obernau: Sanderberg
Rottenberg: Gräfenstein
Rück (Elsenfeld): Johannisberg, Jesuitenberg, Schalk
Wasserlos (Alzenau): Schloßberg, Luhmännchen

Bereich Maindreieck

Großlagenfrei 
Adelsberg: Wernleite
Bergtheim: Harfenspiel
Böttigheim: Wurmberg
Erlenbach bei Marktheidenfeld: Krähenschnabel
Frankenwinheim: Rosenberg
Gaibach: Schloßpark
Gemünden: Scherenberg
Greßenheim: Geisberg
Hallburg: Schloßberg
Homburg: Kallmuth, Edelfrau
Kitzingen: Eheriedener Berg
Kleinochsenfurt: Herrenberg
Lengfurt: Alter Berg, Oberrot
Marktheidenfeld: Kreuzberg
Mainberg: Schloßberg
Remlingen: Krähenschnabel, Sonnenhain
Rimpar: Kobersberg
Rottendorf: Kehlberg
Röttingen: Feuerstein
Schweinfurt: Peterstirn, Mainleite
Tauberzell: Hasennestle
Tauberrettersheim: Königin
Uettingen: Kirchberg
Veitshöchheim: Sonnenschein
Vogelsburg: Pforte
Wiesenfeld: Herbstthal

Großlage Marienberg (Würzburg) 
Würzburg: Pfaffenberg, Stein, Stein/Harfe, Schloßberg, Innere Leiste, Abtsleite, Kirchberg

Großlage Burg (Hammelburg) 
Engenthal: Schloßberg
Feuerthal: Altenberg, Kreuz
Fuchsstadt: Rubenhöll
Hammelburg: Heroldsberg, Trautlestal
Machtilshausen: Sommerleite
Ramsthal: St. Klausen
Saaleck: Schloßberg
Sulzthal: Schlangenberg
Trimberg: Schloßberg
Westheim: Altenberg, Längberg
Wirmsthal: Scheinberg

Großlage Roßtal (Karlstadt) 
Arnstein: Bischofsberg
Eußenheim: First
Gambach: Kalbenstein
Gössenheim: Arnberg
Himmelstadt: Kelter
Karlstadt: Im Stein
Laudenbach (Karlstadt): Schloß
Mühlbach: Fronberg
Retzstadt: Langenberg
Stetten: Stein

Großlage Ravensburg (Thüngersheim) 
Erlabrunn: Weinsteig
Güntersleben: Sommerstuhl
Leinach: Himmelberg
Margetshöchheim: Bärental
Retzbach: Benediktusberg
Rimpar: Koberberg
Thüngersheim: Johannisberg, Scharlachberg
Veitshöchheim: Wölflein, Sonnenschein
Zellingen: Sonnenleite

Großlage Ewig Leben (Randersacker) 
Randersacker: Teufelskeller, Pfülben, Lämmerberg, Marsberg, Sonnenstuhl, Dabug
Theilheim: Altenberg

Großlage Ölspiel 
Sommerhausen: Steinbach, Reifenstein
Eibelstadt: Steinbach
Winterhausen: Kaiser Wilhelm

Großlage Markgraf Babenberg 
Frickenhausen: Fischer, Markgraf, Kapellenberg, Babenberg

Großlage Teufelstor 
Eibelstadt: Kapelleberg, Mönchsleite
Randersacker: Dabug

Großlage Hofrat (Kitzingen) 
Albertshofen: Herrgottsweg
Buchbrunn: Heißer Stein
Kitzingen: Wilhelmsberg, Eselsberg, Kaiser Karl
Mainstockheim: Hofstück
Marktbreit: Sonnenberg
Marktsteft: Sonnenberg
Obernbreit: Kanzel
Repperndorf: Kaiser Karl
Segnitz: Zobelsberg, Pfaffensteig
Sulzfeld: Maustal, Cyriakusberg

Großlage Honigberg 
Dettelbach: Berg Rondell, Sonnenleite
Mainstockheim: Hofstück

Großlage Kirchberg (Volkach) 
Astheim (Volkach): Karthäuser
Escherndorf (Volkach): Fürstenberg, Lump, Berg
Frankenwinheim: Rosenberg
Gaibach (Volkach): Kapellenberg
Köhler (Volkach): Fürstenberg
Hallburg (Volkach): Rosenberg, Kreuzberg
Hergolshausen (Waigolshausen): Mainleite
Krautheim (Volkach): Sonnenleite
Lindach (Kolitzheim): Kreuzpfad
Neuses am Berg (Dettelbach): Glatzen
Neusetz (Dettelbach): Fürstenberg
Nordheim: Vögelein, Kreuzberg
Obereisenheim (Eisenheim): Höll
Obervolkach (Volkach): Landsknecht
Rimbach (Volkach): Landsknecht
Schwanfeld: Mühlberg
Sommerach: Katzenkopf, Rosenberg
Stammheim (Kolitzheim): Eselsberg
Theilheim: Mainleite
Untereisenheim (Eisenheim): Sonnenberg, Berg
Volkach: Ratsherr
Wipfeld: Zehntgraf
Zeilitzheim (Kolitzheim): Heiligenberg

Bereich Steigerwald

Großlagenfrei 
Bamberg: Alter Graben
Eltmann: Schloßleite
Iphofen: Domherr
Gerolzhofen: Arlesgarten
Krum: Himmelreich
Martinsheim: Langenstein
Prappach: Henneberg
Prichsenstadt: Krone
Sand: Himmelsbühl
Staffelbach: Spitzelberg
Tiefenstockheim: Stiefel
Unfinden: Kinnleitenberg
Unterhaid: Röthla
Weiher: Weinberge
Zeil: Mönchshang
Zell: Schlossberg
Zell am Ebersberg: Zeller Schloßberg

Großlage Steige 
Handthal (Ortsteil von Oberschwarzach): Stollberg
Kammerforst (Ortsteil von Oberschwarzach): Teufel
Oberschwarzach: Herrenberg
Wiebelsberg (Ortsteil von Oberschwarzach): Dachs

Großlage Zabelstein 
Gerolzhofen: Köhler
Sulzheim: Köhler, Mönchberg
Dingolshausen: Köhler
Altmannsdorf: Sonnenwinkel
Michelau: Vollburg

Großlage Burgweg (Iphofen) 
Iphofen: Julius-Echter-Berg, Kalb, Kronsberg
Markt Einersheim: Vogelsang, Stüblein
Possenheim: Vogelsang

Großlage Herrenberg 
Castell: Bausch, Kirchberg, Trautberg, Hohnart, Feuerbach, Reitsteig, Kugelspiel, Schloßberg
Neuendorf: Hüßberg, Mönchsbuck, Sonneberg, Wonne

Großlage Kapellenberg 
Oberschwappach: Sommertal
Sand: Kronberg
Schmachtenberg (Zeil am Main): Eulengrund
Steinbach Nonnenberg
Zeil: Pfarrerspflöckn
Ziegelanger: Ölschnabel

Großlage Schild (Abtswind) 
Abtswind: Altenberg
Greuth: Bastel
Kirchschönbach: Mariengarten

Großlage Schloßberg (Rödelsee) 
Großlangheim: Kiliansberg, Schwanleite
Kleinlangheim: Wutschenberg
Rödelsee: Schwanleite, Küchenmeister
Sickershausen: Storchenbrünnle
Wiesenbronn: Wachhügel

Großlage Schloßstück (Frankenberg) 
Bullenheim: Paradies
Ergersheim: Altenberg
Hüttenheim: Tannenberg
Ippesheim: Herrschaftsberg
Ingolstadt (Sugenheim): Rotenberg
Krassolzheim (Sugenheim): Pfannberg
Markt Nordheim: Hohenkottenheim
Weigenheim: Hohenlandsberg
Seinsheim: Hohenbühl
Ulsenheim: Huttenberg
Wiebelsheim: Altenberg

Großlage Burgberg (Ipsheim) 
Dietersheim: Burg Hoheneck
Dottenheim: Burg Hoheneck
Ickelheim: Schloßberg
Ipsheim: Burg Hoheneck
Kaubenheim: Burg Hoheneck
Oberntief: Rosenberg
Weimersheim: Roter Berg

Vergleiche dazu auch die Seite zum Weinbaugebiet Franken

Wine towns
Bavaria-related lists
German wine
German cuisine-related lists